is a railway station in the city of Kiyosu, Aichi Prefecture,  Japan, operated by Meitetsu.

Lines

Station layout
The station has two elevated island platforms. The station has automated ticket machines, Manaca automated turnstiles and is unattended.

Platforms

Adjacent stations

Station history
Shinkawabashi Station was opened on January 23, 1914 as a station on the privately held Nagoya Electric Railway.

Passenger statistics
In fiscal 2013, the station was used by an average of 647 passengers daily.

Surrounding area
 Kiyosu City Hall

See also
 List of Railway Stations in Japan

References

External links

 Official web page 

Railway stations in Japan opened in 1914
Railway stations in Aichi Prefecture
Stations of Nagoya Railroad
Kiyosu, Aichi